The Time of the Cherries (French: Le temps des cerises) is a 1938 French drama film directed by Jean-Paul Le Chanois and starring Gaston Modot, Svetlana Pitoëff and Fabien Loris. It takes its title from the song of the same name.

The film's sets were designed by the art director Georges Wakhévitch.

Partial cast
 Gaston Modot as Gaston Ravaux  
 Svetlana Pitoëff as Gilberte  
 Fabien Loris as Pierrot  
 Jandeline as La paysanne  
 François Viguier as Le paysan  
 Georges Spanelly as Le directeur  
 Jean Dasté as Le fils du directeur  
 Jacques B. Brunius as Le petit-fils du directeur 
 Camille Corney as Le décorateur  
 André Delferrière
 Claire Gérard as La dame maniérée  
 Gabrielle Fontan as Antoinette

References

Bibliography 
 Andrews, Dudley. Mists of Regret: Culture and Sensibility in Classic French Film. Princeton University Press, 1995.

External links 
 

1938 drama films
French drama films
1938 films
1930s French-language films
Films directed by Jean-Paul Le Chanois
French black-and-white films
Films scored by Joseph Kosma
1930s French films